Shambhu Rai or Sambhu Rai is a renowned Nepali singer, songwriter, musician and a music producer. Some of his famous songs are चिट्ठी तिमीलाई लेखु भन्छु, यो मन भन्छ कहाँ जाऊ, चलेछ बतास सुस्तरी and आलु दम चाना. He also plays Sarangi, a short-necked fiddle used throughout South Asia

References

21st-century Nepalese male singers
Living people
People from Dhankuta District
Year of birth missing (living people)
Rai people